The Grassland Ecological Area, also known as the Grasslands Ecological Area is a designated Ramsar Site (wetland of international importance) in Central California. It covers an area of  along the San Joaquin River in California's Central Valley. The wetlands are on the Pacific Flyway, and are an important habitat for resident and migratory waterbirds.

It consists of several federal and state protected areas. The federal protected areas are managed together as the San Luis National Wildlife Refuge Complex.
National wildlife refuges, managed by the United States Fish and Wildlife Service (USFWS)
 San Luis National Wildlife Refuge
 Merced National Wildlife Refuge
 San Joaquin River National Wildlife Refuge

Federal wildlife management areas, managed by private owners with conservation easements by the USFWS
 Grasslands Wildlife Management Area

State wildlife areas, managed by the California Department of Fish and Wildlife
 North Grasslands Wildlife Area (Salt Slough, China Island, Gadwall)
 Volta Wildlife Area
 Los Banos Wildlife Area (Los Banos, Mud Slough)

California State Parks, managed by the California Department of Parks and Recreation
 Great Valley Grasslands State Park

References

Ramsar sites in the United States
wetlands of California
San Joaquin River
Protected areas of Merced County, California